Whisky Bay is a bay between Rink Point and Stoneley Point on the northwest side of James Ross Island. The bay was likely discovered by Otto Nordenskjold of the Swedish Antarctic Expedition in 1903, who roughly mapped this area and showed small bays in this position. It was surveyed by Falkland Islands Dependencies Survey (FIDS) in 1945 and 1952, and later called "Caleta Santa Eduvigis" on an unpublished Argentine Antarctic Expedition map, about 1959. Named by the United Kingdom Antarctic Place-Names Committee (UK-APC) in 1983 in association with nearby Brandy Bay.

Bays of James Ross Island